Sea Garden may refer to:

 Sea Garden (Burgas), Bulgaria
 Sea Garden (Varna), Bulgaria